The 2012 Humboldt State Lumberjacks football team represented Humboldt State University during the 2012 NCAA Division II football season. Humboldt State competed in the Great Northwest Athletic Conference (GNAC).

The 2012 Lumberjacks were led by fifth-year head coach Rob Smith. They played home games at the Redwood Bowl in Arcata, California. Humboldt State finished the season with a record of seven wins and four losses (7–4, 6–4 GNAC). The Lumberjacks outscored their opponents 341–270 for the 2012 season.

Schedule

References

Humboldt State
Humboldt State Lumberjacks football seasons
Humboldt State Lumberjacks football